Bonaventure Enemali (born 21 June 1984), is a Nigerian politician and a former Anambra State Commissioner for Lands, Physical Planning and Rural Development from 3 June 2019 to 17 March 2022, replacing Nnamdi Onukwuba. He is the founder of Expression 1 Awka. From 2018 to 2019, he served as the Commissioner for Youth Empowerment and Creative Economy.

Early life and education
Enemali started his primary education in 1990 at Ogbe Primary School Nzam. In 1996, he moved to St. Charles College, Onitsha, finishing in 2002. In 2003, he preceded to Anambra State University (now, Chukwuemeka Odumegwu Ojukwu University), where he graduated with a degree in business administration. In 2014, he received an abridged masters in business administration from Metropolitan School Of Business Management, before preceding to Redeemer's University Nigeria where he received a master's degree in management psychology. In 2019, he received the honororary degree of LL.D. from Commonwealth University, London and a master class certificate in business management and leadership from the London Graduate School in October 2019. He did his mandatory National Youth Service Corps in Sapele, Delta State, where he received the NYSC Merit Award in 2008, for his work on HIV/AIDS.

Career
Enemali started his career working with People Against HIV/AIDS in Barracks (PAHAB) as program officer from 2008 to 2009. In 2008, he founded African Child Social Empowerment Centre. In 2009, he worked at Emzor Pharmaceutical, starting as Admin/HR supervisor, before becoming Admin/HR manager. He is the chairman of Greenland Farms, Rose Specialist Hospital, Essential Cargo Handling and Logistics and the co-founder of bosshalls.com. He has worked as board member of Anambra State Investment, Promotion and Protection Agency (ANSIPPA), Anambra State Physical Planning Board, Anambra State Boundary Committee (SBC) and chairman of National Youth Service Corps governing board in Anambra State. He is a member of Certified management consultant, Chartered Association of Business Administrators and fellow of Institute Management Consultant, Chartered Association of Business Administrators, Canada.

On 26 March 2018, Enemali was appointed as Commissioner for Youth Empowerment and Creative Economy by the Governor of Anambra State, Willie Obiano, replacing Uju Nwogu. In December 2018, he provided one year free health insurance for all the Igala speaking communities in Anambra State. On 3 June 2019, he was re-appointed as the Commissioner for Lands, Physical Planning and Rural Development, replacing Nnamdi Onukwuba. In 2020, he founded Expression 1 Awka. On 17 March 2022, he left office as the Commissioner for Lands, Physical Planning and Rural Development and was replaced by Offornze Amucheazi after the expiration of Obiano's tenure as executive governor of Anambra State.

Personal life
Enemali is from Odi-Ukwala clan, Enekpa, Nzam, Anambra State, Nigeria. He is of Igala extraction of Anambra State. His father was Emmanuel Enemali. His mother was Roseline Enemali. He is the last child in a family of twelve children.

References

Living people
1984 births
Igbo people
Igbo politicians
Nigerian Roman Catholics
People from Anambra State
Commissioners of ministries of Anambra State
Chukwuemeka Odumegwu Ojukwu University alumni